Zhang Liming (born 27 November 1957) is a Chinese rowing coxswain. She competed in the women's coxed four event at the 1984 Summer Olympics.

References

1957 births
Living people
Chinese female rowers
Olympic rowers of China
Rowers at the 1984 Summer Olympics
Place of birth missing (living people)
Coxswains (rowing)